Evan Samuel Williams (born 15 July 1943) is a Scottish former footballer, who played as a goalkeeper for Third Lanark, Wolves, Aston Villa, Celtic, Clyde and Stranraer. Williams was also manager of Vale of Leven.

The largest part of his playing career was at Celtic, for whom he made 82 league appearances between 1969 and 1973. Williams played in the 1970 European Cup Final, which Celtic lost 2–1 to Feyenoord.Evan was named man of the match in the final even though on the losing team.

References

External links 

1943 births
Living people
Sportspeople from Dumbarton
Footballers from West Dunbartonshire
Association football goalkeepers
Scottish footballers
Vale of Leven F.C. players
Third Lanark A.C. players
Wolverhampton Wanderers F.C. players
Aston Villa F.C. players
Celtic F.C. players
Clyde F.C. players
Stranraer F.C. players
Scottish Football League players
English Football League players
Scottish football managers
East Fife F.C. players